Isabella of Armenia (1275–1280 – murdered in Armenia before 9 April 1323) was the daughter of Leo II of Armenia.

Early life and family
Isabella was the fourth daughter and tenth child of Leo II of Armenia and his wife, Keran; she was also their third daughter to be named Isabella (both previous daughters had died in early childhood). She was the twin sister of Sempad.

Marriage and issue
She was married at Nicosia in 1292–1293 to Amalric of Cyprus, by whom she had six children:

 Hugh
 Henry (died c.1321)
 Guy (died 1344)
 John (died 1343)
 Bohemond (died 1344)
 Maria, who married her cousin Leo IV of Armenia

At some time between 1320 and 1323, Isabella, along with her son Henry, was imprisoned and murdered by Oshin of Corycos. Oshin, who was acting as regent for Leo IV of Armenia, wanted to reduce the number of claimants to the throne of the Cilician Kingdom. It has been rumored that Oshin poisoned Isabella to remove her from the line of inheritance.

Bibliography

Isabella
1323 deaths
1275 births
Murdered royalty
Isabella
14th-century Armenian people
14th-century Armenian women
13th-century Armenian people
13th-century Armenian women